1412 Lagrula, provisional designation , is an asteroid from the inner regions of the asteroid belt, approximately 7 or 23 kilometers in diameter, depending on the body's divergent reflectivity measurements.

It was discovered on 19 January 1937, by French astronomer Louis Boyer at the North African Algiers Observatory in Algeria. It was later named after French astronomer Philippe Lagrula.

Classification and orbit 

Lagrula is a presumed member of the Flora family, a large group of stony S-type asteroids in the inner main-belt. It orbits the Sun at a distance of 2.0–2.5 AU once every 3 years and 4 months (1,204 days). Its orbit has an eccentricity of 0.11 and an inclination of 5° with respect to the ecliptic.

Physical characteristics

Photometry 

During March and April 2013, photometric observations of Lagrula were made over ten nights by Italian astronomer Giovanni Casalnuovo at Eurac Observatory in Bolzano, Italy. Lightcurve analysis gave a rotation period of 5.9176 hours and a brightness variation of 0.28 magnitude. In January 2016, a more refined period of 5.882 hours with an amplitude of 0.44 magnitude was obtained from a bimodal lightcurve by Spanish astronomer group OBAS, Observadores de Asteroides.

Diameter and albedo 

According to the survey carried out by NASA's Wide-field Infrared Survey Explorer with its subsequent NEOWISE mission, Lagrula measures 7.8 kilometers in diameter, and its surface has an albedo of 0.318 and 0.36, respectively (most recent results only). Casalnuovo assumed a C-type, rather than an S-type, because he found an average V–R color index of  magnitude.

Naming 

This minor planet was named after French astronomer Joanny-Philippe Lagrula (1870–1941), discoverer of the minor planet 775 Lumière and director of the Quito Astronomical Observatory and Algiers Observatory. Naming citation was neither published in The Names of the Minor Planets nor in the Minor Planet Circulars, but researched and compiled by astronomer and author Lutz D. Schmadel, based on his private communications with his colleges.

References

External links 
 Asteroid Lightcurve Database (LCDB), query form (info )
 Dictionary of Minor Planet Names, Google books
 Asteroids and comets rotation curves, CdR – Observatoire de Genève, Raoul Behrend
 Discovery Circumstances: Numbered Minor Planets (1)-(5000) – Minor Planet Center
 
 

001412
Discoveries by Louis Boyer (astronomer)
Named minor planets
19370119